Glyphipterix palpella is a species of sedge moth in the genus Glyphipterix. It was described by Walsingham in 1914. It is found in Central America.

References

Moths described in 1914
Glyphipterigidae
Moths of Central America